Secoya (also Sieko Coca, Paicoca, Airo Pãi) is a Western Tucanoan language spoken by the Secoya people of Ecuador and Peru.

Included among the Secoya are a number of people called Angoteros. Although their language comprises only some dialectal differences of Secoya, there are no other communicative obstacles present. The Siona of the Eno River, linguistically different from the Siona of the Putumayo, say there are significant dialectal differences between their language and Secoya, but are still considered a part of them. In ethnographic publications, the Secoya go by other alternate names as well: Encabellado, Pioje (meaning "no" in Secoya), Santa Maria, and Angutera.

Phonology

Voiceless Stops

The voiceless stops /p, t, k, kʷ/ are the same as Spanish, however the aspiration is more articulated in Secoya. The phoneme /t/ is pronounced with the tip of the tongue making contact with the upper teeth. The velar-labialized /kʷ/ is pronounced similarly to /k/, but with rounding of the lips. The glottal stop /ʔ/ almost disappears when strong stress on the previous syllable does not occur.

Voiced Stops

In intervocalic context, the voiced stop /d/ is performed by the simple variant [r], equal to the Spanish intervocalic /r/. Nasal speech is performed with the nasal consonant [n].

Aspiration

The voiceless phonemes /sʰ/ and /h/ are both articulated in the alveolar position, making them difficult to distinguish. The /s/ is pronounced a little harder and determines a dull elongation prior to an unstressed vowel. The phoneme /zʰ/ has some laryngeal stress and expresses the laryngealization on adjacent vowels.

Nasals

The nasal consonant /m/ is pronounced the same as in Spanish. The sound n, which is phonemic in other Western Tucanoan languages, is contained in Secoya as a variant of the voiced stop /d/.

Glides

The glides /w/ and /y/ are almost equal to the vowels /u/ and /i/ respectively, but more tightly articulated. The /w/ resembles the hu in the Spanish "huevo". When it occurs at an adjacent nasal vowel, [w] becomes nasalized. The /y/ is pronounced almost like that in Spanish, but the Secoya articulate it with slightly more friction. When it occurs contiguous to a nasal vowel, the result becomes nasalized and sounds like the Spanish ñ.

Consonants & Vowels

Consonants

Vowels 

Back vowels are made with rounded lips and the others are made with non-rounded lips.

Morphology

Nouns

The noun in Secoya is distinguished, in most forms, through the general category and the specific unit. The basic form of a noun, without suffixes, indicates the general category (men, children, canoes, stones, eggs, etc.) without specifying a definite number of elements. To indicate the singular or plural, that is, a number of specific elements, suffix classifiers (in the case of inanimate nouns) or gender suffixes (in the case of animate nouns) are added. To indicate a definite number of inanimate objects, a plural suffix is added to a noun. When the word refers to a number of specific elements, we use the definite article in the Spanish translation. However, it can also be translated with the indefinite article.

Animate Nouns

Animals

The nouns denoting animals appear in their basic form without suffix to indicate the generic type. To indicate the singular, the suffix -e or -o is added. To form the plural noun, the specifier hua'i  is added to any of the two forms.

Supernatural and Spiritual

The nouns denoting supernatural beings and celestial bodies appear in their basic form to indicate both the generic as the singular. To form the plural, add -o and hua'i. All of these beings appear as characters in the animistic legends of the Secoya.

Person/Number/Gender

Person 

The nouns denoting people typically lead gender suffixes with a masculine or feminine singular. To form the plural noun, the specifier hua'i is added. The nouns whose basic form is a verb or adjective gender carry the suffix -ë for singular masculine or -o for singular female. After the vowel /o/, the masculine ending becomes -u and after the vowels /e/ and /i/, becomes -i. (If both vowels are identical, the vowel is reduced to one)

Number 

The number describes the head noun in the same way it does the adjective. Their order in the noun phrase is before the adjective, when both appear.

To emphasize a number, express the same grammatical agreement suffix classifiers in the case of the adjective.

The noun that the number describes can be suppressed when the context permits.

Gender

Classification

Suffix Classifiers

The suffix classifiers indicate, besides the idea of a specific unit, the form or function of the object, conceptualized by the Secoya perspective.

Nouns that function as classifiers

The following inanimate nouns can be freeform in some contexts and can also describe the form or function of an inanimate noun.

Inanimate nouns without classifiers

Some inanimate nouns never appear with a suffix classifier; in this case the sense of generality or unit is inferred from the context. However, an adjective or another attribute can change them.

Space

Locatives are formed by adding to a basic form, whether it's a noun, verb, adverb, demonstrative, or other, to one of the suffixes indicating space or time.

Locative Suffix -ro

The locative suffix -ro "place" means a point or region. They don't appear with nouns, but with other grammatical forms to form a noun.

Locative Suffix -ja̱'a

Locative suffix -ja̱'a "about, near" describes the relationship of a locative component.

Demonstratives

The demonstrative pronoun ja "that" occurs with suffixes classifiers, local or temporary, to refer to an object, place or time.

The demonstrative pronoun iye "this" occurs with suffix classifiers, local and temporary, as with the separate hua'i for plural words and maca to refer to a person, place, thing. These refer to a specific previously defined nominal element. When a gender suffix is added, the form of the pronoun is uses i-.

Time

Tense

There are times for all people and genders, distinguished in the declarative modes of involvement perspective: the present, the immediate past, the distant past and future. The immediate past is not so much of recent events, but events that the speaker considers to be important in the present. It is distinguished by the immediate past speaker who considers unimportant events in the present. That is, they are already forgotten or outdated events.

The following examples demonstrate the present and immediate past tense and use the root caje "down".

This next example demonstrates the immediate past tense when the basic form of the verb ends in [í] or [ʔí]. It uses the root sa'i "go".

This example demonstrates the distant past. This category is pointed out with the suffix -a̱'- after the basic form of the verb.

This example demonstrates future tense.

Modality

Potential Suffix

The potential suffix is demonstrated by the addition of -ja̱i on the basic form of the verb. It has the variants -ja̱' and -ja̱ and indicates that the event is to take place.

Irrealis Suffix

The irrealis suffix is demonstrated by the addition of -ra' on the basic form of the verb. It indicates that the event has not been performed. It's never used with the present or future tense.

Obligative Suffix

The obligative suffix is demonstrated by the addition of -ti̱ to the basic form of the verb and indicates an urgency to perform the action. It can be coupled with the -ra' irrealis suffix.

Predicates and Arguments

Pe'o

Peo'ji

Obliques
The use of the oblique case markers in Secoya is not very complex. The oblique case suffixes -na, -hã-ã, and -hã’de are used to express specific grammatical relations. The first oblique case suffix -na expresses the spatial relation of goal, -hã-ã marks objects expressing a path, and -hã’de marks accompaniment.

Grammatical Case
Unlike Andean languages (Quechua, Aymara), which mark nominative, accusative, dative, and genitive cases, Amazonian languages like Secoya are limited to locative and instrumental/comitative cases. Enclitics are used to indicate grammatical case and the following suffixes indicate the nominal items that are linked to it.

-pi (source of action, agent)

-ni (movement to an animate object)

-na (destination)

-re/-té (reference)

Endangerment
The Ecuadorian-Peruvian War in 1941 had a great impact on the life of the Secoya after it created a separation of the local groups by splitting up the region. This division resulted in the obsolescence of many customs and traditions that were once prevalent in their culture. In the early 1970s, the Texaco and Gulf oil companies converged on Ecuador when massive petroleum reserves were discovered underground. The extensive periods of oil drilling ravaged many of their settlement areas, culminating in disastrous ecological problems like water and soil contamination. Even today, the Secoya still face many problems involving geopolitical feuds, harassment by oil companies, and the colonization and assimilation of Mestizo culture. The language status of the Siona-Secoya group is threatened, with only 550 speakers in Ecuador and 680 in Peru.

Notes

References
 Johnson, Orville E.  (1990). Gramatica secoya (Ed. limitada, 1. ed.). Quito, Ecuador: Inst. Lingüístico de Verano.

External links 
 ELAR archive of Documentation of Ecuadorian Secoya

IMM:immediate past
DISTANT:distant past
OBL:obligative
DES:destination

Tucanoan languages
Languages of Ecuador
Languages of Peru